Year 1038 (MXXXVIII) was a common year starting on Sunday (link will display the full calendar) of the Julian calendar.

Events 
 By place 
 Europe 
 Emperor Conrad II (the Elder) travels to Southern Italy and holds court in Troia. He orders Pandulf IV of Capua to restore the territories of Monte Cassino. Pandulf holes himself up in the fortress of Sant'Agata de' Goti, and dispatches tribute (300 lb of gold) and his son as hostage to Troia as a token of peace. Conrad accepts his offer, but the son escapes. Conrad goes on the offensive and seizes Capua, and gives it to Guaimar IV of Salerno.
 Duke John II drives his brother Manso II and his mother Maria out of Amalfi. He has Manso blinded and exiled to the island of Sirenuse. John reconciles with Maria, and allows her to remain as co-ruler of Amalfi.
 The Banu Tujib clan is deposed by Al-Mustain I, who starts the Huddid Dynasty, which rules over the Taifa of Zaragoza for almost a century (approximate date).
 The name of Versailles, at this time a small village, appears for the first time in a medieval charter in France.
 Duke Bretislav I of Bohemia invades Poland. He captures and destroys the cities of Gniezno and Poznań.
 August 15 – On the death of his uncle, Stephen I, Peter Orseolo becomes the second ruler of Hungary.
 August – A battle occurs near the town of Alfuente, Andalucia, between the Taifa of Granada and the Taifa of Almeria, as described by the Jewish poet Samuel ibn Naghrela. 

 Asia 
 The Western Xia declare their independence from the Liao Dynasty in China.

Births 
 Ibn Butlan, Arab Nestorian Christian physician (d. 1075)
 Isaac ibn Ghiyyat, Jewish rabbi and philosopher (d. 1089)
 Rostislav of Tmutarakan, Kievan Rus' prince (d. 1066)
 Sancho Garcés, Spanish nobleman (approximate date)

Deaths 
 March 28 – Hai Gaon, Jewish theologian (b. 939)
 April 23 – Liudolf of Brunswick, margrave of Frisia
 May 4 – Gotthard, bishop of Hildesheim (b. 960)
 May 22 – Shibl al-Dawla Nasr, Mirdasid emir of Aleppo
 July 6 – Ōnakatomi no Sukechika, Japanese poet (b. 954)
 July 18 – Gunhilda of Denmark, German queen 
 August 15 – Stephen I, king of Hungary
 November 1 – Herman I, German nobleman 
 December 3 – Emma of Lesum, German noblewoman
 December 20 – Beorhtheah, bishop of Worcester
 Aethelnoth, archbishop of Canterbury
 Alice of Normandy, countess of Burgundy
 Al-Tha'alibi, Persian historian (b. 961)
 Budic of Nantes, French nobleman
 Ealdred, ealdorman of Bamburgh
 Ermengol II (the Pilgrim), count of Urgell 
 Farrukhi Sistani, Persian poet (or 1037)
 Felix of Rhuys, Breton Benedictine abbot
 Habbus al-Muzaffar, Zirid ruler of Granada
 Herman IV, duke of Swabia (House of Babenberg)
 Kyiso, Burmese king of the Pagan Dynasty
 Ralph III (or Raoul), French nobleman
 William VI, French nobleman (b. 1004)

References